Socialist Initiative  (Sosialistiki Protovoulia) was a Greek short-lived political party founded in 1976 by former members of Centre Union – New Forces, such as  and Dimitris Tsatsos. In 1977, it participated in Progress and Left Forces Alliance, a coalition of small left-wing parties, and dissolved a few months later. Most of its members joined PASOK.

Social democratic parties in Greece
Political parties established in 1976
Political parties disestablished in 1977